I Blame You is the debut album by the New York City-based rock band Obits, released on March 24, 2009, by Sub Pop. Singer/guitarist Rick Froberg, who is also a visual artist, provided the album's artwork. When interviewed about the meaning of the artwork, he commented: "If I get something I like, there's some meaning to it, and I can detect the meaning, I have ideas about what the subject matter might be, but I think it's best if I don't say. That’s the beauty of the whole thing, I get to hear all these different takes on it."

Track listing

Personnel
Rick Froberg – guitar, vocals, album art
Sohrab Habibion – guitar, vocals
Greg Simpson – bass guitar
Scott Gursky – drum kit
Geoff Sanoff – producer, recording engineer
Eli Janney – producer, recording engineer
Atsuo Matsumoto and Jim Smith – additional engineering
Joe Lambert – mastering
Dave Gardener – additional mastering

References

2009 albums